Digna Strautmane (born 18 September 1998) is a Latvian basketball player for Georgia Tech and the Latvian national team.

She participated at the 2018 FIBA Women's Basketball World Cup.

Syracuse statistics

Source

References

External links

1998 births
Living people
Latvian expatriate basketball people in the United States
Latvian women's basketball players
Power forwards (basketball)
Basketball players from Riga
Syracuse Orange women's basketball players
Georgia Tech Yellow Jackets women's basketball players